Eugeniu Știrbu (born August 8, 1945, in Petreni) is a politician from Moldova.

Biography 

Eugeniu Știrbu served as a member of the Parliament of Moldova (1998–2001). He was the General Secretary of Democratic Party of Moldova.

Eugeniu Știrbu has been the chairman of the Central Election Commission since November 11, 2005. On June 21, 2010, Știrbu was arrested as he was crossing the Kuchurgan checkpoint on his way from Odessa Airport to Chișinău, after a flight to Poland, where he had observed the presidential poll. Taken to Tiraspol, Știrbu learned that the separatist authorities had initiated criminal proceedings against him in 2007 for organizing elections in the much-disputed village of Corjova, Dubăsari. Later that day, the release was possible due to the intervention of Ambassador Philip Remler, the head of the OSCE Mission to Moldova.

Professional experience

 2012–present – The head of the Chisinau office of International Institute for monitoring democratic and parliamentary process and suffrage protection in the CIS (IIMDP).
 September 2009 – June 2010 – the president of the Association of European Election Officials (ACEEEO)
 2005–2011 – the chairman of the Central Election Commission of the Republic of Moldova.
 2003–2005 – the councillor of Chisinau City Council
 1998–2001 – the deputy of the Parliament of the Republic of Moldova
 1998–2001 – Vice  president of the Parliamentary Commission for Youth, Sport and Tourism
 1997–1998 – The Head of Government's Section of Human Resources Policy
 1996–1997 – Deputy Director of the joint-stock company "Moldova- Tur"
 1994–1996 – Deputy Director of National Relations Department of Government of the Republic of Moldova
 1991-1994 – President of National Association of Charity "Sanitas"
 1990–1991 – legal counsel of the President of Football Club "Nistru"
 1986–1990 – Vice- president of the State Committee for physical culture and sport
 1983–1986 – President of the Republican Council of the Association of Athletes' Villages "Colhoznic",  Chisinau
 1977–1982 – Section of propaganda and agitation of City district party committee, Cutuzov
 1977–1982 – member of district Soviet of Cutuzov
 1972–1976 – member of City Soviet of Anenii Noi
 1972–1977 – chief, organizational section, District Committee of Komsomol, Anenii Noi
 1970–1971 – the head teacher of sport school for children, Anenii Noi

References

External links 
 Eugeniu ȘTIRBU

1945 births
Living people
Democratic Party of Moldova politicians
Moldovan MPs 1998–2001